Ceratonia oreothauma is a species of tree native to Oman and Somaliland.

Description
Ceratonia oreothauma is a small tree with gnarled branches and rough bark which grows up to 8 meters high. It is evergreen, with singly-pinnate leaves bearing up to 20 leaflets.

Ceratonia oreothauma flowers in March and April. Flowers are either purely male or purely female, with minute and sterile primary anthers.

Distribution and habitat
Ceratonia oreothauma has two widely separated populations which are classified as separate subspecies. C. oreothauma ssp. oreothauma is found in a single valley on Jebel Aswad in the eastern Hajar Mountains of Oman between 900 and 2000 meters elevation. C. oreothauma subsp. somalensis occurs in the mountains of Somaliland between 1500 and 1800 meters elevation.

Systematics
Ceratonia has one other species, Ceratonia siliqua or carob, which is distributed around the Mediterranean. C. oreothauma is morphologically distinct from C. siliqua. In addition the pollen grains of C. oreothauma are slightly smaller than those of C. siliqua and are tricolporate rather than tetracolporate.

References 

Flora of Oman
Flora of Somalia
oreothauma
Plants described in 1980
Somali montane xeric woodlands